Cașcaval pane is an Eastern European dish made usually with cheese similar to Gouda that is coated in bread crumbs. In Romania and Bulgaria, this cheese is called  Cașcaval or Кашкавал (Kashkaval) respectively, hence the beginning of the name 'Kashkaval Pane'. Kashkaval is a common cheese in Eastern Europe, especially the Balkans and parts of Central Europe and is also eaten in parts of Southern Europe and the Levant. Cașcaval pane is traditionally served as an appetiser and can be garnished with fried potatoes (french fries), mamaliga (polenta), with mujdei or a variety of salads.

See also 

 Mozzarella sticks

References 

Romanian breaded dishes
Cheese dishes
Deep fried foods